The 2004–05 ABA season was the fourth season of the American Basketball Association. The regular season started in November 2004 and the year ended with the championship game in March 2005 featuring the Arkansas RimRockers and Bellevue Blackhawks. Arkansas defeated Bellevue, 118-103 in the championship game to win their first ABA title.

Regular Season Standings

Playoff Results

References

American Basketball Association (2000–present) seasons
ABA